The Last Company is a 1930 German war film directed by Curtis Bernhardt and starring Conrad Veidt, Karin Evans and Erwin Kalser. It was part of the popular cycle of Prussian films which portrayed patriotic scenes from Prussian history. It was shot at the Babelsberg Studios of UFA in Berlin. The film's art direction was overseen by Andrej Andrejew who designed the film's sets. It was shot on location around Havelland in Brandenburg. It is also known by the alternative title Thirteen Men and a Girl. It was later remade in 1967 as A Handful of Heroes.

Synopsis
Following the Battle of Jena in 1806 as the French armies commanded by Napoleon overrun Prussia, a small detachment of Prussian troops take up position in a windmill and resolve fight to the last man to hold them off for as long as possible. Meanwhile, the windmill owner's daughter chooses to stay and fight alongside them.

Cast

References

Bibliography

External links

1930 films
Films of the Weimar Republic
1930 war films
1930s historical films
German historical films
German war films
1930s German-language films
Films directed by Curtis Bernhardt
Prussian films
Films set in 1806
Napoleonic Wars films
German black-and-white films
UFA GmbH films
Films produced by Joe May
Siege films
Films scored by Ralph Benatzky
1930s German films
Films shot at Babelsberg Studios